The Cheoah River is a tributary of the Little Tennessee River in North Carolina in the United States.

It is located in Graham County in far western North Carolina, near Robbinsville, and is approximately 20 miles in length. Its headwaters are in the Appalachian Mountains where it flows northwest near Robbinsville, to the Lake Santeetlah and flows towards the Tennessee border with a terminus at the Little Tennessee between the Cheoah Dam and Lake Calderwood.

Variant names
According to the Geographic Names Information System, it has also been known historically as: 
Cheowa River
Cheowah River

References

Tributaries of the Little Tennessee River
Rivers of North Carolina
Bodies of water of Graham County, North Carolina